Vyalovo is a rural locality (a village) in Nagornoye Rural Settlement, Petushinsky District, Vladimir Oblast, Russia. The population was 9 as of 2010.

Geography 
Vyalovo is located on the Volga River, 30 km northwest of Petushki (the district's administrative centre) by road. Golovino is the nearest rural locality.

References 

Rural localities in Petushinsky District